Men of Crisis: The Harvey Wallinger Story is a short film directed by Woody Allen in 1971. The film was a satirization of the Richard Nixon administration made in mockumentary style.

Allen plays Harvey Wallinger, a thinly disguised version of Henry Kissinger. The short was produced as a television special for PBS and was scheduled to air in February 1972, but it was pulled from the schedule shortly before the airdate. Reportedly, PBS officials feared losing its government support and decided not to air it. Allen, who previously had sworn off doing television work, cited this as an example of why he should "stick to movies". The special never aired and can now be viewed in The Paley Center for Media and is often found on YouTube.

Two of Allen's regular leading ladies, Louise Lasser and Diane Keaton, make appearances, as does the Richard Nixon-lookalike Richard M. Dixon. Actor Reed Hadley narrates. The fictional characters are interspersed with newsreel footage of Hubert Humphrey, Spiro Agnew, and Nixon in embarrassing public moments. Allen would later explore this style again in his 1983 film Zelig.

See also
 List of American films of 1971

References

External links

1971 films
1971 comedy films
1971 short films
American political satire films
American satirical films
American television films
Films directed by Woody Allen
American independent films
American mockumentary films
Films with screenplays by Woody Allen
Unreleased American films
Unaired television shows
Films about Richard Nixon
American comedy short films
1970s English-language films
1970s American films